The Tarrant Formation is a geologic formation that dates to the Middle Cenomanian stage of the Late Cretaceous.

Paleobiota
 Aetodactylus

Footnotes

Cretaceous geology of Texas